Adam Kucz (born 16 June 1971) is a retired Polish football striker.

References

1971 births
Living people
Polish footballers
Zagłębie Sosnowiec players
GKS Katowice players
Odra Wodzisław Śląski players
SV Elversberg players
Lech Poznań players
ŁKS Łódź players
Rozwój Katowice players
Kolejarz Stróże players
Association football forwards
Polish expatriate footballers
Expatriate footballers in Germany
Polish expatriate sportspeople in Germany